Derya Akay (born 1988) is a Turkish artist based in Vancouver, Canada. Akay has held numerous solo and group exhibitions in Canada, Japan, Mexico, U.S., and Turkey. In 2010, Akay graduated from Emily Carr University and completed a residency at the Banff Centre.

Work 
Derya Akay's artistic practice involves community organizing, gathering, cooking, food and knowledge sharing, gardening, performance, and installation. Akay often uses tableware, textiles, food, and organic material in installations and performances with a focus on feminized and collective labour, while using intimate and domestic spaces such as kitchens, gardens, and bedrooms to showcase his work.

Akay's mother, Dilara Akay, is an activist and artist. They collaborated on Ghost Spring (2018), a work about the political upheavals in Turkey and the loss of loved ones, installed and performed at Mountain View Cemetery in Vancouver, Canada, in association with grunt gallery.

Recent Exhibitions and Projects 
Akay has collaborated with artists such as Haruko Okano, T’uy’t’tanat Cease Wyss, Julia Feyrer, and Anne Low.

 Queer Dowry (2022), What Water Knows, The Land Remembers, Toronto Biennial of Art
 Looking at the Garden Fence (2021), with Vivienne Bessette and Garden Don't Care artist collective at Sahalli Park Community Garden, Elisabeth Rogers Community Garden, Harmony Garden X̱wemelch’stn pen̓em̓áy
 Meydan (2021), Polygon Gallery
 The Neighbours Plate (2020), with Dana Qaddah and Amna Elnour, Unit 17
 Green Grocer (2018), Unit 17
 with bread (2017), Campbell River Art Gallery
 Punice (2017), Del Vaz Projects
 Vancouver Special: Ambivalent Pleasures (2016), Vancouver Art Gallery

References 

Living people
1988 births
Turkish artists
Emily Carr University of Art and Design alumni